Bill Osborn (born c. 1966) is an American football player who attended the University of Pittsburgh and played in the National Football League, World League and the Arena Football League. Osborn has also worked as an NFL scout, a color analyst and an executive in the medical device industry.  He worked at VICIS, Inc., a company whose mission is to create a revolutionary high-tech helmet called the ZERO1.[13]  Osborn, who first consulted with VICIS before coming on board as a full-time employee in the spring of 2015.[14]  The 2018 version of Vicis’ ZERO1 helmet ranked No. 1 atop the NFL's 2018 Helmet Laboratory Testing Performance Results. [16]

Amateur career

Osborn attended the University of Pittsburgh where he went on to play three varsity sports  – football, basketball and baseball. While at Pitt, he became the first athlete since Mike Ditka to earn a letter in all three varsity sports. He was awarded nine varsity letters at Pitt – four each in football and baseball, and one in basketball. He finished his college football career in the top-10 all-time receiving list at the University of Pittsburgh. As a member of the Pitt basketball team, Osborn was part of the 1986-87 Big East Conference championship team.

Osborn grew up in Wildwood Crest, New Jersey and attended Wildwood High School, where he was dubbed "The Wizard of Oz" by a radio announcer.  Osborn is one of the most highly respected athletes to emerge from southern New Jersey. Osborn won 11 varsity sports letters at Wildwood High, where he graduated in 1984. He won all-league first-team honors nine times, and is the only person to win first-team all CAL, all 4 years in baseball playing three different positions. He also won all-state honors in football and baseball, and scored 1140 points in basketball.

In 1990, Osborn was named the 1980s and 1990s South Jersey Male High School Athlete of the Decade and a core part of Wildwood High School's football tradition by The Press of Atlantic City, and was selected to the All Decade baseball and football   In November 1996, he was inducted into Basketball Hall Of Fame and in 1999 his high school #12 was officially retired  by the Wildwood Board of Education.

Professional football career

Osborn played professionally in the National Football League for the Philadelphia Eagles. He also played for the Barcelona Dragons of the World League and in the Arena Football League with the Pittsburgh Gladiators (now the Tampa Bay Storm). As a WR/LB for the Gladiators in 1990 he caught 11 passes for 159 yards and made 3 interceptions. After retiring because of head and neck injuries, Osborn became a scout for the Kansas City Chiefs for two years

Broadcast career

Post football, Osborn began a broadcast career that has spanned 28 years. During that time, he's worked with ESPN Radio.  Comcast, Fox Sports Net, WABC-NYC radio and 610WIP Philadelphia Sports Talk Radio. He was a pre-game, post-game  and color analyst for the Big East and also University of Pittsburgh Football Network from 1995-2003, as well as the color analyst for the Philadelphia Soul of the Arena Football League. He also served as the color analyst for Comcast/CN8 regional college game of the week, and as an Arena Football League color analyst for the National Game of the week on the Versus Network for the 2008 season.  Osborn has served as the Color Analyst for the Arena Football League's Philadelphia Soul on Comcast's Sports Net Central TV and their Radio Partner's since the inception of the franchise.  He also is the Co-Host of the "OZZIE & KRAUSEY" show.  A weekly sports talk show heard in the Philadelphia/South Jersey market on 610Sports ESPN Radio.  Bill is also the Color Analyst for the American Indoor Football League's, Philadelphia Yellow Jackets.  2016 was their inaugural season.  Bill rejoined the 2016 Pitt Panther broadcast team, returning as color analyst for the 2016 and 2017 seasons.

Biography

Osborn and his two sons, live in the Marlton section of Evesham Township, New Jersey. Osborn served as VP of Business Development for VICIS, a company developing a new football helmet 'ZERO1'  designed to better mitigate impact forces compared to traditional helmets.  He's also president of the Bill Osborn Foundation, which focuses on colon cancer awareness and raises money for underprivileged children through a celebrity golf tournament in his father's name, run in partnership with the Sand Barrens Golf Club & Cape Regional Medical Center in Cape May County.  Most recently, he held the position of Director, National Accounts for Medtronic Inc., a Fortune 50 company and medical device industry leader.  He worked 15 years for Medtronic.  Prior to that, he worked six years for Ethicon Inc., a division of Johnson & Johnson.  In August 2017, Osborn was selected to the Maxwell Club Board of Governors.  The Maxwell Club has honored excellence for all level of football since 1935. [15]

References

13.'Ex-Wildwood football star at forefront of concussion-reducing helmet technology', Philly Voice, July 17, 2015.
14.' Former Wildwood star with new company keen to reduce football concussions', shorenews.com  July 8, 2015.
15.  Maxwell Club Announces Bill Osborn as a Member of the Club's Board of Governors. https://www.maxwellfootballclub.org , August 31, 2017.
16. VICIS ZERO1 helmet https://www.geekwire.com/2018/nfl-helmet-safety-testing-results-vicis-ranks-first-high-tech-head-protector/

Year of birth missing (living people)
Living people
American football wide receivers
Barcelona Dragons players
Kansas City Chiefs scouts
Philadelphia Eagles players
Pittsburgh Gladiators players
Pittsburgh Panthers baseball players
Pittsburgh Panthers football players
Pittsburgh Panthers men's basketball players
People from Wildwood Crest, New Jersey
Players of American football from New Jersey
Sportspeople from Cape May County, New Jersey
American men's basketball players
1960s births